Jambavan (Devanagari: जाम्बवान्), also known as Jambavanta (Devanagari: जाम्बवन्त), is the king of the bears in Hindu texts.

He emerges out of the mouth of Brahma when the creator deity yawns. He assists the Rama avatar of Vishnu in his struggle against the rakshasa king Ravana. In the Ramayana, he helps Hanuman realise his potential, just before his famous leap over to the island of Lanka. Jambavan was present at the Churning of the Ocean, and is supposed to have circled Vamana 21 times in a single leap, when he was acquiring the three worlds from Mahabali.

Jambavan, together with Parashurama and Hanuman, is considered to be one of the few to have been present for both the Rama and the Krishna avataras. His daughter Jambavati was married to Krishna.

Nomenclature 

Jambavan is also known as:
 Jambavantan
 Jambavanta (জাম্বৱন্ত, Assamese (Axomiya))
 Jambavan(ಜಾಂಬವಂತ, Kannada script)
 Jamvanta Kannada script
 Jāmbubān ‍(Bangla)
 Champu (Cambodia)
 Jambuwana (Malay)
 Jāmbabān (Odia)
 Jambuvaan ( Marathi)
 Jambavan (Malayalam)
 Jāmbavantudu (జాంబ వంతుడు, Telugu)
 Keeratuvan (Punjabi) 
 Zabaman (Burmese)
 Sambuvan (சாம்புவன், Tamil)
 Chomphuphan (ชมพูพาน, Thai)

Legends

Birth
In the beginning, when Brahma was sitting on the lotus from the navel of Vishnu, he started meditating and yawned, from which a bear was born, which later became Jambavan. It is said he was called Jambavan either because he was born on Jambudvipa, or because he was born while yawning. He was present at the time when Vishnu was fighting the Madhu and Kaitabha daityas. At the time of Ramayana, he was 6 manvantaras old.

Ramayana	
In the epic Ramayana, Jambavan helped Rama find his wife Sita and fight her abductor, Ravana. It is he who makes Hanuman realise his immense capabilities, and encourages him to fly across the ocean to search for Sita in Lanka.

Mahabharata	
In the Mahabharata, Jambavan had killed a lion, who had acquired a gem called syamantaka from Prasena, after killing him. Krishna was suspected of killing Prasena for the jewel, so he tracked Prasena's steps until he learned that he had been killed by a lion, who had been killed by a bear. Krishna tracked Jambavan to his cave, and a fight ensued. The combat between Krishna and Jambavan ensued for 27/28 days (per Bhagavata Purana) and 21 days (per Vishnu Purana), after which Jambavan began to grow tired. Realising who Krishna was, Jambavan submitted. He gave Krishna the gem, and also presented him his daughter Jambavati, who became one of Krishna's wives.

Temple 
The only temple of Jambuvanta is located at Jamkhed, in the Jalana district. His temple is in a cave on the hill north of Jamkhed. The temple is about 2 kilometres away from Jamkhed village.

See also 
 Vamana
 Sugriva
 Ramayana

References

External links
 Jambavanmotivating Hanuman for the task of leaping the ocean. in Valmiki Ramayana - Kishkindha Kanda in Prose Sarga 65 - Accessed August 14, 2006.
 Jambavan- A Rksha Warrior

 Characters in the Ramayana
Bear deities
 Characters_in_the_Bhagavata_Purana